Santiago Colomo Martínez is a Spanish animator and visual effects artist. He was nominated for an Academy Award in the category Best Visual Effects for the film The One and Only Ivan.

Selected filmography 
 The One and Only Ivan (2020; co-nominated with Nick Davis, Greg Fisher and Ben Jones)

References

External links 

Living people
Place of birth missing (living people)
Year of birth missing (living people)
Visual effects artists
Spanish animators